Archibald Alison may refer to:
Archibald Alison (author) (1757–1839), Scottish episcopalian minister and essayist
Sir Archibald Alison, 1st Baronet (1792–1867), Scottish lawyer and historian (son of the priest)
Sir Archibald Alison, 2nd Baronet (1826–1907), British Army general (son of the lawyer)